ST1 may refer to:

 St1, a Finnish energy company
 Star Trek: The Motion Picture, a 1979 film, first in the original film series
 Star Trek (film), a 2009 film, first in the J.J.Abrams film series
 Starship Troopers (film), a 1997 film, first in the film series
 The Stoke-on-Trent area code, see ST postcode area
 Phillips ST1 Speedtwin, an acrobatic airplane, see Speedtwin E2E Comet 1
 Zenvo ST1, a supercar
 Seagate ST1, a hard disk drive
 ST-1, a communications satellite

See also
 First Street (disambiguation) (1st Street)
 STI (disambiguation)